Attacus aurantiacus is a moth of the family Saturniidae first described by Walter Rothschild in 1895. It is found on the Kai Islands of Indonesia.

References

Saturniidae
Moths described in 1895
Moths of New Guinea